Levan III Dadiani, born Shamadavle (შამადავლე) (died 1680) was Prince of Mingrelia, of the House of Dadiani, from 1661 to 1680. His reign unfolded against the background of a series of civil wars in western Georgian polities, in which Levan III was an opponent of King Bagrat V of Imereti to whom he lost a battle and his own wife.

Early life 
Shamadavle was a son of Iese, brother of Levan II Dadiani, Prince of Mingrelia. In 1661, he was installed by King Vakhtang V of Kartli as Prince of Mingrelia after evicting his relative, Vameq III Dadiani. Upon his enthronement, Shamadavle assumed the name of his uncle, Levan, and married Vakhtang's niece, Tamar.

Civil wars 
In 1663, Levan attempted to make use of palace intrigues plaguing the kingdom of Imereti and attacked King Bagrat IV, who was married to Tamar's elder sister Tatia. Levan was defeated and made prisoner. While in captivity, he was forced to divorce Tamar, whom Bagrat took as his new wife. Instead, the prince of Mingrelia was convinced to marry Bagrat's sister, Tinatin, the former wife of the nobleman Goshadze, whom Levan suspected of adultery with his daughter. Levan was set free, but he remained deeply offended by the loss of his wife; hence, his enmity with Bagrat perpetuated. 

In October 1672, Levan survived an invasion by an Ottoman force, which plundered Mingrelia, but failed to take the Rukhi fortress, where the Mingrelian prince had entrenched himself. The episode was witnessed and described in his travelogue by the French traveller Jean Chardin. By 1678, Levan again became involved in an Imeretian civil war, rendering his support to Bagrat V's rival, Archil, son of Vakhtang V of Kartli. When Bagrat was briefly deposed, the queen Tamar was arrested and sent back to Levan in Mingrelia. Next year, Bagrat reconquered Imereti with the Ottoman auxiliaries, then raided Mingrelia, and retook his wife. Levan was only able to resume his government with the help of Giorgi Gurieli, Prince of Guria, whom he surrendered his son and heir, Manuchar, as a hostage to prove loyalty. His reign was further disturbed by the marauding raids by the Abkhaz on the Mingrelian borders.

Levan III Dadiani died in 1680. His heir, Manuchar, was murdered by Giorgi Gurieli as part of his ultimately failed design to seize control of Mingrelia. Levan III was, thus, succeeded by his natural son, Levan IV.

Children 
Levan III Dadiani had three children, two sons and a daughter.
 Manuchar (c. 1663 – 1680), Levan III's only son of his marriage with Princess Tamar. As a young boy, he was betrothed to Darejan, daughter of King Archil of Imereti, but the marriage was never consummated.
 Levan IV Dadiani, Levan's son by a concubine and his successor as Prince of Mingrelia.
 Mzekhanum, Levan's only daughter, was married to Prince Katsia Chikovani, Lord of Lechkhumi.

References 

1680 deaths
House of Dadiani
17th-century people from Georgia (country)